UFC Fight Night: MacDonald vs. Thompson (also known as UFC Fight Night 89) was a mixed martial arts event held on June 18, 2016 at TD Place Arena in Ottawa, Ontario, Canada.

Background
The event was the first that the promotion has hosted in Ottawa. 

The card was headlined by a welterweight bout between former UFC Welterweight Championship challenger Rory MacDonald and five-time kickboxing world champion Stephen Thompson.

This event marked the promotion's inaugural fight in the women's flyweight division as former UFC Women's Strawweight Championship challenger Valérie Létourneau faced Joanne Calderwood. Despite that, a formal introduction of the division wasn't made since promotion officials are still determining whether or not to permanently add the division.

Norifumi Yamamoto was scheduled to face Chris Beal at the event. However, Yamamoto was pulled from the bout on May 26 due to an undisclosed injury and was replaced by former Bellator Featherweight Champion and one time UFC Bantamweight Championship challenger Joe Soto.

Alex Garcia was scheduled to face Colby Covington, but pulled out on June 9 due to undisclosed reasons and was replaced by promotional newcomer Jonathan Meunier.

Randa Markos missed weight on her first attempt at the weigh ins, coming in at 117.5 lb. She was given additional time to make the weight limit, but made no attempts to cut further. Instead, she was fined 20 percent of her fight purse, which went to Jocelyn Jones-Lybarger.

Results

Bonus awards
The following fighters were awarded $50,000 bonuses:
Fight of the Night: Steve Bossé vs. Sean O'Connell
Performance of the Night: Donald Cerrone and Krzysztof Jotko

See also
List of UFC events
2016 in UFC

References

UFC Fight Night
2016 in mixed martial arts
Mixed martial arts in Canada
Sports competitions in Ottawa
June 2016 sports events in Canada
2016 in Ontario
Events in Ottawa